Creffield is a surname. Notable people with the surname include:

 Dennis Creffield (1931–2018), British artist 
 Edmund Creffield ( 1870–1906), German-American religious leader